Novyye Sharashli (Yañı Şäräşle) is a rural locality (a village) in Starosharashlinsky Selsoviet, Bakalinsky District, Bashkortostan, Russia. The population was 36 as of 2010. There is 1 street.

Geography 
Novyye Sharashli is located 9 km northwest of Bakaly (the district's administrative centre) by road. Georgiyevka is the nearest rural locality.

References 

Rural localities in Bakalinsky District